Fight Club: Members Only is a 2006 Indian action film directed by Vikram Chopra and produced by Ravi Walia and Sohail Khan. The film features an ensemble cast of Suniel Shetty, Zayed Khan, Sohail Khan, Dino Morea, Ritesh Deshmukh, Aashish Chaudhary, Rahul Dev, Dia Mirza and Amrita Arora while Ashmit Patel, Yash Tonk, Kulbhushan Kharbanda and Neha Dhupia are featured in crucial roles.

Plot
The story follows four friends, Vicky, Karan, Somil and Diku. The four often attend clubs and drink alcohol together. One night, they witness a physical brawl, and Vicky comes up with the idea of making a "Fight Club," in which the participants will be allowed to fight physically but with valid reason. The night when the Fight Club is opened, Somil learns that his uncle, who brought him up and currently lives in Delhi, has met some troubles. Some local gangsters want to take over the club of Somil's uncle to use it for drugs smuggling. After being firmly rejected, they threatened to kill him. Somil then leaves for Delhi to help his uncle, leaving the other three boys running the Fight Club in Mumbai.

When Mohit, a college youngster, enters the club and takes part in a fight, he ends up beating his opponent severely to critical condition. After being stopped by Vicky, Mohit attacks him, to which response Vicky throws him out of the club. The scene is caught by several police officers, they arrest Mohit and seal the Fight Club, but others manage to escape and select a new place to keep running the Fight Club. After Mohit is released, he arrives with Anna's old gangster friends to get revenge, but is rejected by the latter.

Anna, Mohit's older brother is released from prison where he stayed for 8 years and visits Mohit to see if he has changed himself from keeping fighting and working for gangsters, Anna tells Mohit that the reason he quit the gangster group and handed himself to the police was that he wanted to set a good example for Mohit. He then takes Mohit to Delhi for vacation.

Vicky, Karan and Diku keep running the Fight Club. One night, Vicky's past classmate Sameer shows up in the club to challenge Vicky. Sameer almost beats Vicky, but police arrives in the scene, making all of them escape. The new place is sealed again by police, and the three friends decide to give it up and go to Delhi to visit Somil.

Somil's uncle was killed by gangsters before the three arrive. The four then take over Somil's uncle's club Crossroads to reopen it, but the gangsters almost destroy it again in the first night after its reopening. The four then decide to hire a bouncer to protect their club from being destroyed again, and Vicky comes up with the idea of hiring Sameer. Sameer rejects at first, but later shows up when the four are fighting with the gangster group and saves them and joined them in running the club.

While staying in Delhi, Mohit cheats Anna by telling him that he will go back to Mumbai to attend college but instead going to meet his old gangster friends Sandy and Dinesh, who killed Somil's uncle. Anna coincidentally meets Sandy and Dinesh, the two then invite Anna to come back to their gangster group again but are rejected by Anna. Dinesh comes up with idea to get Anna back.

Mohit meets Diku, making him aware that the four of them are also in Delhi. Dinesh takes Mohit to Crossroads to revenge, but lets Mohit enter alone. When Mohit is beaten by the five of them, Dinesh doesn't help or even show up, Moreover, he kills Mohit soon after he's beaten, making Vicky and his friends naturally blamed, and the five of them are arrested for murder but are soon bailed by Vicky's father, in exchange, Vicky agrees with his father to return to Mumbai with him, Soon enough, Anna finds out about this incident, and plans to avenge Mohit with his whole crew.

Vicky develops a romantic relationship with Anu, Karan's younger sister, and Karan falls in love with his neighbour Sonali. As the friends get a phone call they realize that Anna has captured Somil and Dikku. Karan and Sameer rush to save them, but beaten in a fight with Sandy and Dinesh. Vicky then arrives to help his friends and is knocked down. Somil then realizes that Dinesh was the one who killed Mohit with a small screwdriver when Dinesh tries to kill Somil with the same weapon, but Anna saves Somil and kills Dinesh. Sandy is left devastated as Anna, Vicky, Sameer, Somil, Karan and Dikku return to the bar. Ultimately, Anna befriends the five and the Crossroads club is converted into a regular nightclub.

Cast
Suniel Shetty as Anna Shetty
Sohail Khan as Sameer Ali
Zayed Khan as Vicky Khanna
Dino Morea as Karan Chopra
Ritesh Deshmukh as Somil 
Aashish Chaudhary as Dikku
Ashmit Patel as Dinesh Vidyarthi
Rahul Dev as Sandy
Yash Tonk as Mohit Shetty
Dia Mirza as Anu Chopra
Amrita Arora as Sonali Malhotra
Neha Dhupia as Dr. Komal (friendly appearance)
Kulbhushan Kharbanda as Suhas (guest appearance)
Puneet Vashisht as Sapru
Murali Sharma as Police Inspector
Kamal Chopra as Mr.Khanna
Vikrant Anand as Fighter

Music

Track list
Songs for Fight Club: Members Only were composed by Pritam, and the lyrics were written by Mayur Puri and Neelesh Misra.

Reception
Jaspreet Pandohar of BBC.com gave the film 2 out of 5, writing ″While Brad Pitt and Edward Norton brought brains and brawn to the table and helped carry their Fight Club to it's final dark twist, Chopra's leading men and adapted storyline take the safe route by using their secret society to tackle a powerful adversary. The outcome is an amusing, but poorly executed, flick that packs a light punch.″ Raj Aggarwal of Planet Bollywood gave 1.5/
10, writing ″The movie is a victim of its own subject. Director Vikram Chopra has concentrated on its visual appearance at the cost of ignoring the content that cannot be substituted. Music & dances are ordinary. The First song in a disco is well executed. Neha Dhupia as the love interest of Sameer is there in an “Extra” special appearance. Rest of the ladies is there to balance the sex ratio. Aashish Chowdhry is irritating with his wise (read foolish) cracks. Ashmit Patel…as a charsi is another guy I would like to enroll for the Fight Club. Suniel Shetty & Zayed Khan are OK and the rest better rest…″

References

External links

2006 films
2000s Hindi-language films
Films featuring songs by Pritam
Indian action drama films
Films about social issues in India
Indian satirical films
2006 action films
Films shot in Mumbai
Mockbuster films
2000s satirical films
Hindi-language action films
Films shot in the Maldives